Sharon Maiden (born 23 June 1961 in Ealing, London) is a British actress.  She made her film debut opposite John Cleese in the 1986 movie Clockwise.

Film and television appearances 
 Full House (series 1, episode 6) 1985
 Five Alive 1986
 Clockwise 1986 The Comic Strip Presents... (series 3, episode 6) 1988The Bill Series 5 (episode 81 – A Matter of Trust) 1989
 Chelmsford 123 (series 2, episode 4) 1990The Bill Series 9 (episode 41 – High Hopes and Low Life) 1993London's Burning (series 6, episode 1) 1993
 Inspector Morse 2000
 Casualty 2003 Footballer's Wives 2002
Holby City 2008
Doctors 2009

References

External links 
 
 Rotten Tomatoes
 BFI

Living people
1961 births
20th-century English actresses
21st-century English actresses
Actresses from London
English film actresses
English television actresses